is a Japanese actress. She has appeared in jidaigeki and contemporary dramas. She has also appeared in the 2004 Toho movie Godzilla:Final Wars.

Filmography

Films
 Godzilla: Final Wars (2004)
 The Setting Sun (2022)
 Even If This Love Disappears from the World Tonight (2022)

Television
 Shiroi Kyotō (2003), Michiyo Satomi

References

External links 
 
 Profile at JMDb (in Japanese)

1970 births
Living people
People from Tokyo
Japanese actresses